Story of My Foolishness is a 1966 Hungarian comedy film directed by Márton Keleti.

Cast 
 Éva Ruttkai - Kabók Kati
 Lajos Básti - Mérey László
 Irina Petrescu - Jacqueline
 László Mensáros - Forbáth György
 Manyi Kiss - Gizi néni
 Zoltán Várkonyi - Színész
 János Rajz - Kati papája
 László Kozák - Színész
 László Bánhidi - Színész

References

External links 

1966 comedy films
1966 films
Films directed by Márton Keleti
Hungarian comedy films